David Petway is a former defensive back in the National Football League. He played with the Green Bay Packers during the 1981 NFL season.

References

1955 births
Players of American football from Chicago
Green Bay Packers players
American football defensive backs
Northern Illinois Huskies football players
Living people